Huguo may refer to the following places in China:

Huguo, Sichuan, a town in Luzhou, Sichuan
Huguo Township, in Longchuan County, Yunnan
Huguo Subdistrict, in Wuhua District, Kunming, Yunnan

See also
Huguo Temple (disambiguation)